In 2009, the Wales national rugby union team toured North America to play tests against Canada and the United States. They won both matches, beating Canada 32–23 in Toronto on 30 May, before a 48–15 win over the United States in Chicago on 6 June. Wales travelled with an inexperienced touring party due to several senior players being included in the British & Irish Lions' squad for their tour to South Africa. Five players earned their first Wales caps on the tour, including future captain Sam Warburton and centre Jonathan Davies.

Squads

Wales
With head coach Warren Gatland and attack coach Rob Howley on the 2009 British & Irish Lions tour to South Africa, forwards coach Robin McBryde was named as coach for Wales' tour of North America. Captain Ryan Jones was a surprise omission from the Lions squad, so he was able to continue as captain for Wales' tour. He was named to lead a 32-man squad that included 11 uncapped players, given opportunities by the selection of 13 Wales players in the Lions squad. After James Hook was called up to the Lions tour, Sonny Parker was added to the Wales touring party. Prop Eifion Lewis-Roberts dropped out of the tour due to a knee ligament injury and was replaced by Paul James, while full-back Dan Evans was called up to replace Gareth Owen, who suffered an Achilles injury. The squad was finally reduced to 26 with the dropping of Scarlets flanker Rob McCusker and Blues wing Richard Mustoe, in addition to the unavailability of Dragons players Luke Charteris, Lewis Evans, Dan Lydiate and Jason Tovey due to their involvement in a Heineken Cup play-off. Charteris rejoined the squad for the second match against the United States after Bradley Davies suffered an injury.

Canada
Canada head coach Kieran Crowley named a 31-man squad for their games against Wales and Ireland, and for the Churchill Cup. The squad included uncapped forwards Chauncey O'Toole and Andrew Tiedemann, while centre Dave Spicer and former Wales under-21 lock Luke Tait.

Matches

Canada v Wales
McBryde named an inexperienced team for Wales' opening match against Canada; aside from scrum-half Gareth Cooper, the backs had just 10 caps between them, with debuts for Scarlets centre Jonathan Davies and full-back Dan Evans. Three more uncapped players were named on the bench in prop Craig Mitchell, flanker Sam Warburton and centre Jonathan Spratt. Early penalties from James Pritchard gave Canada a 6–0 lead inside the opening quarter of an hour, but a try from Chris Czekaj, making his first Wales appearance for almost two years, was converted by Dan Biggar to put Wales in front at the midway point of the half. After Canada lock Luke Tait was sent to the sin bin for killing the ball, Biggar then kicked three penalties before the end of the half, sandwiching another from Pritchard, to give Wales a 16–9 lead at the break. Cooper was injured in an unsuccessful try-scoring attempt just before half-time and replaced by Dwayne Peel for the second half. A try from Sean Duke, converted by Pritchard, levelled the scores early in the second half, only for Tom James to put Wales back in front with another converted try, before Biggar stretched Wales' lead with another two penalties shortly afterwards. A try by Ed Fairhurst, converted by Pritchard, narrowed the deficit to 29–23 just before the hour mark, but a penalty from Biggar put Wales nine points ahead with eight minutes to play. In the final quarter, Wales brought on Mitchell and Spratt for their first appearances, but Warburton was made to wait.

United States v Wales
The match against the United States was Wales' 600th test match. Despite scoring a try in the previous match, Wales wing Chris Czekaj was dropped to make room for Mark Jones, who had missed the Canada game due to injury. McBryde also replaced both half-backs, with Peel and Nicky Robinson coming in for Cooper and Biggar; in the forwards, hooker Gareth Williams replaced Richard Hibbard, while Ian Gough started in place of the injured Bradley Davies in the second row; Dragons lock Luke Charteris came onto the bench after joining the tour late, leaving Scarlets flanker Josh Turnbull and Ospreys centre Sonny Parker as the only touring players not to make an appearance in either match. For the United States, coach Eddie O'Sullivan dropped former Scarlets and Dragons fly-half Mike Hercus, and replaced him with Ata Malifa.

Nicky Robinson opened the scoring for Wales with a pair of penalties either side of the 10 minute mark, his first points for Wales in almost three years, but United States wing Gavin DeBartolo responded with one of his own a couple of minutes later. Those were to be the United States' only points of the first half, though, and Wales opened up a 27–3 half-time lead. Captain Ryan Jones went off midway through the half, having failed to recover from a head injury suffered in the opening seconds of the match, replaced by debutant Sam Warburton, but tries from Scarlets Mark Jones and Jonathan Davies (his first in international rugby) put Wales 20–3 up with 22 minutes gone. Another Wales back-rower Robin Sowden-Taylor had to be substituted before half an hour had been played, forcing Hibbard into filling in in an unfamiliar position. United States flanker Louis Stanfill was sent to the sin bin for pulling down a maul shortly afterwards, and Wales took advantage of their numerical superiority, forcing the Americans into conceding a penalty try. The United States reduced the deficit to 17 points with the first score of the second half, a try from Alipate Tuilevuka that was converted by DeBartolo, but Tom James restored Wales' lead with a try just past the midway point of the half. James suffered an injury with just over 10 minutes left to play; Cooper came on in his place and scored almost immediately before Davies scored his second try of the game, making JJ Gagiano's late try mere consolation. James and Ryan Jones were sent for scans on their injuries on their return from the tour.

Broadcasting
Broadcast rights for the matches were held in Wales by the BBC and S4C. The match against Canada was shown live on BBC Two Wales with highlights on S4C, while the game against the United States was shown live on S4C with highlights on BBC Two Wales. Radio commentaries were provided by BBC Radio Wales for both matches and BBC Radio Cymru for the United States game.

References

2009 rugby union tours
Wales national rugby union team tours
Rugby union tours of Canada
Rugby union tours of the United States